COFRA Group (full name COFRA Holding AG)  is a privately held company established in 2001 in Zug, Switzerland, to coordinate the global businesses of the Brenninkmeijer family. It is active in the fields of retail, real estate, asset management, private equity and renewable energy. COFRA is owned and managed by members of the Brenninkmeijer family. Its chairman is Martijn Brenninkmeijer and the CEO is Boudewijn Beerkens.

Group structure 
C&A, the fashion retail company, is the oldest business in the group. It was founded in 1841, when brothers Clemens and August Brenninkmeijer opened the first C&A store in Sneek, the Netherlands. C&A currently has around 1,900 stores and employs over 50,000 people in 21 countries - mostly in Europe, but also in Brazil (since 1976), Mexico (since 1999) and China (since 2007). In March 2019, COFRA appointed Edward Brenninkmeijer, CEO of C&A Brazil, Mexico and China, CEO of its C&A European retail business.

In 2019, C&A Modas became a listed company in Brazil, trading on the BE Stock Exchange under the ticker CEAB3.

Redevco, a European commercial retail and residential real estate business, was founded in 1999 and is based in Amsterdam, the Netherlands. Redevco currently manages more than 300 properties. Its assets under management total EUR 7.5 billion. Redevco's CEO is Andrew Vaughan, who was appointed to the position in November 2011.

Bregal Investments is a platform of private equity and fund investment vehicles, founded in 2002. Since inception, Bregal has invested more than EUR 13 billion. Quentin Van Doosselaere and Steven Black are joint CEOs.

Anthos Fund & Asset Management (AFAM) was founded in 1929. It provides asset management services to the Brenninkmeijer family, their philanthropic foundations and the pension funds of various COFRA entities. AFAM's CEO is Jacco Maters, who was appointed in September 2018.

In January 2022, COFRA took over the Dutch greenhouse manufacturer Dalsem. The family company Dalsem designs and builds high-tech greenhouses that help produce food in a resource-efficient manner.

Management and business practices 
COFRA is a privately held company owned by a group of around 60 descendants of Clemens and August Brenninkmeijer. The group is also known as the “Sneekerkring”, a reference to the town of Sneek, where C&A was founded. Although traditionally the majority of owners were male, today around half of all trainees are female. These family owners play an active role in the business. Prospective family owners are subject to a strict selection process and have to follow a long period of training before they are admitted. Within the group of family owners, key decisions are taken on the basis of consensus rather than voting.

Responsibility for COFRA's strategy and management lies with the COFRA executive board, whose chairman is Martijn Brenninkmeijer.

C&A Foundation was a corporate foundation that worked with manufacturers, government, charities and major brands to promote sustainability throughout the industry, especially by promoting circular fashion, and to improve the working conditions of those employed in the industry.

C&A is the world's largest user of certified organic cotton. It was also the first brand to produce Cradle to Cradle Gold Certified jeans and T-shirts.

Entrepreneurs Fund is invested in General Fusion, which aims to create a mass energy source without any greenhouse emissions or nuclear waste.

References

External links
COFRA Holding Site

Clothing retailers of Switzerland
Financial services companies established in 2001
Retail companies established in 2001
Companies based in Zug